Life Master may refer to:

 an American Contract Bridge League title
 a United States Chess Federation title